Roy Arthur Grover (January 17, 1892 – February 7, 1978)  was a Major League Baseball second baseman.

In , Grover was the Athletics' starting second baseman. That year, he set the all-time Athletics franchise record for sacrifice hits with 43, a record that still stands.

Notes

Sources 

Major League Baseball second basemen
Philadelphia Athletics players
Washington Senators (1901–1960) players
Tacoma Tigers players
Butte Miners players
Oakland Oaks (baseball) players
Sacramento Senators players
Mission Reds players
Baseball players from Washington (state)
1892 births
1978 deaths
People from Snohomish, Washington